The  (Board of Construction) was formed in 1831 in the Ministry of the Navy to examine projects relating to warship construction and dockyard infrastructure. It was composed of at least 18 members throughout its existence and included senior representatives from the corps of engineers, artillery branch, and inspectors of hydraulic works.

Among its tasks was evaluating projects, plans and cost estimates for warships, preparing the instructions for building new ships, preparing the documentation for competitive proposals and tenders and evaluating new inventions submitted to the ministry.

By the 1890s the council was controlled by very traditional admirals that often clashed with more innovative ministers. It was disbanded in 1905 and its functions turned over to the new  (Technical Committee).

Citations

Bibliography

French Navy
French military staff
French Third Republic
1831 establishments in France
1905 disestablishments in France